Flight 910 may refer to

American Airlines Flight 910, mid-air collision on 28 June 1952
FedEx Express Flight 910, runway skid on 28 October 2016

0910